The 1999 Big Ten men's basketball tournament was the second annual postseason men's basketball tournament for the Big Ten Conference and was played from March 4 through March 7, 1999 at the United Center in Chicago, Illinois. The championship was won by Michigan State who defeated Illinois in the championship game. As a result, Michigan State received the Big Ten's automatic bid to the NCAA tournament.

Due to Michigan basketball scandal, Michigan has vacated the records from this tournament. Similarly, due to the Minnesota academic scandal, Minnesota's appearance in this tournament was vacated. Ohio State also vacated its appearance in the tournament due to NCAA Sanctions.

Seeds

All Big Ten schools participated in the tournament. Teams were seeded by conference record, with a tiebreaker system used to seed teams with identical conference records. Seeding for the tournament was determined at the close of the regular conference season. The top five teams received a first round bye.

Bracket

All-Tournament Team 
 Mateen Cleaves, Michigan State – Big Ten tournament Most Outstanding Player
 Cory Bradford, Illinois
 Antonio Smith, Michigan State
 Evan Eschmeyer, Northwestern
 Michael Redd, Ohio State
Source

References

Big Ten men's basketball tournament
Tournament
Big Ten men's basketball tournament
Big Ten men's basketball tournament